Soumen Mahapatra is an Indian politician and the current Minister for Irrigation and Waterways and previously served as the Minister for Water Resources Investigation & Development in the Government of West Bengal. He is also an MLA, elected from the Tamluk constituency in 2011 and 2021, Pingla constituency in 2016 and Nandanpur constituency in 2006 West Bengal assembly election.

References 

State cabinet ministers of West Bengal
Living people
West Bengal MLAs 2001–2006
West Bengal MLAs 2011–2016
West Bengal MLAs 2016–2021
1958 births